The 1976–77 season was Burnley's first consecutive season in the second tier of English football. They were initially managed by Joe Brown until February 1977, when Harry Potts took over.

Appearances and goals

|}

Matches

Football League Division Two
Key

In Result column, Burnley's score shown first
H = Home match
A = Away match

pen. = Penalty kick
o.g. = Own goal

Results

Final league position

FA Cup

League Cup

Anglo-Scottish Cup

References

Burnley F.C. seasons
Burnley